The Beudiu is a left tributary of the river Apatiu in Romania. It flows into the Apatiu in the village Beudiu.

References

Rivers of Romania
Rivers of Bistrița-Năsăud County